Jacob "Jaap" Helder (11 November 1907 in Paterswolde – 13 January 1998 in Paterswolde) is a sailor from the Netherlands, who represented his country at the 1960 Summer Olympics in Naples. After the 5th race Gerard Lautenschutz, who was crewing on the Dutch Flying Dutchman Daisy (H102), needed to go home due to family circumstances. Helder with helmsman Ben Verhagen crewed the last three races. The team took 5th place.

Sources
 
 
 
 
 
 
 

1907 births
1998 deaths
People from Tynaarlo
Dutch male sailors (sport)

Sailors at the 1960 Summer Olympics – Flying Dutchman
Olympic sailors of the Netherlands
Sportspeople from Drenthe
20th-century Dutch people